Luis Carlos Lucumí (born 25 December 1958) is a Colombian former javelin thrower.

Lucumí had a personal best throw of 77.80m, set when he won the 1989 South American Championships in Medellín, which remained a South American record for six years. He was a bronze medalist at the 1991 Pan American Games, won gold at the 1993 Central American and Caribbean Games and was a three-time Bolivarian Games champion.

References

External links

1958 births
Living people
Colombian male javelin throwers
Athletes (track and field) at the 1987 Pan American Games
Athletes (track and field) at the 1991 Pan American Games
Medalists at the 1991 Pan American Games
Pan American Games medalists in athletics (track and field)
Pan American Games bronze medalists for Colombia
Competitors at the 1993 Central American and Caribbean Games
Central American and Caribbean Games gold medalists in athletics
Central American and Caribbean Games gold medalists for Colombia
South American Games medalists in athletics
South American Games gold medalists for Colombia
Competitors at the 1982 Southern Cross Games
World Athletics Championships athletes for Colombia
20th-century Colombian people
21st-century Colombian people